King crabs are a taxon of decapod crustaceans chiefly found in cold seas. Because of their large size and the taste of their meat, many species are widely caught and sold as food, the most common being the red king crab (Paralithodes camtschaticus).

King crabs are generally thought to be derived from hermit crab ancestors within the Paguridae, which may explain the asymmetry still found in the adult forms. This ancestry is supported by several anatomical peculiarities which are present only in king crabs and hermit crabs. Although some doubt still exists about this hypothesis, king crabs are the most widely quoted example of carcinisation among the Decapoda. The evidence for this explanation comes from the asymmetry of the king crab's abdomen, which is thought to reflect the asymmetry of hermit crabs, which must fit into a spiral shell.

Controversial taxon
Although formerly classified among the hermit crabs in the superfamily Paguroidea, king crabs are now placed in a separate superfamily, Lithodoidea.
This is not without controversy, as there is widespread consensus in the scientific community that king crabs are derived from hermit crabs and closely related to pagurid hermit crabs, and therefore a separate superfamily in the classification poorly reflects the phylogenetic relationship of this taxon.

Species 

Around 121 species are known, in 10 genera:

 Cryptolithodes Brandt, 1848
 Cryptolithodes expansus Miers, 1879
 Cryptolithodes sitchensis Brandt, 1853 – umbrella crab
 Cryptolithodes typicus Brandt, 1848 – butterfly crab
 Glyptolithodes Faxon, 1895
 Glyptolithodes cristatipes (Faxon, 1893)
 Lithodes Latreille, 1806
 Lithodes aequispinus J. E. Benedict, 1895 – golden king crab or brown king crab
 Lithodes aotearoa Ahyong, 2010
 Lithodes australiensis Ahyong, 2010
 Lithodes ceramensis Takeda & Nagai, 2004
 Lithodes chaddertoni Ahyong, 2010
 Lithodes confundens Macpherson, 1988
 Lithodes couesi J. E. Benedict, 1895 – scarlet king crab
 Lithodes ferox Filhol, 1885
 Lithodes formosae Ahyong & Chan, 2010
 Lithodes galapagensis Hall & Thatje, 2009
 Lithodes jessica Ahyong, 2010
 Lithodes longispina Sakai, 1971
 Lithodes macquariae Ahyong, 2010
 Lithodes maja (Linnaeus, 1758) – Norway king crab or trollkrabbe
 Lithodes mamillifer Macpherson, 1988d
 Lithodes mandtii   
 Lithodes manningi Macpherson, 1988
 Lithodes megacantha Macpherson, 1991
 Lithodes murrayi Henderson, 1888
 Lithodes nintokuae Sakai, 1976
 Lithodes panamensis Faxon, 1893
 Lithodes paulayi Macpherson & Chan, 2008
 Lithodes rachelae Ahyong, 2010
 Lithodes richeri Macpherson, 1990
 Lithodes robertsoni Ahyong, 2010
 Lithodes santolla (Molina, 1782) – Chilean centolla or Chilean king crab
 Lithodes turkayi Macpherson, 1988
 Lithodes turritus Ortmann, 1892
 Lithodes unicornis Macpherson, 1984
 Lithodes wiracocha Haig, 1974
 Lopholithodes Brandt, 1848
 Lopholithodes foraminatus (Stimpson, 1859) – brown box crab
 Lopholithodes mandtii Brandt, 1848 – Puget Sound king crab
 Neolithodes A. Milne-Edwards & Bouvier, 1894
 Neolithodes agassizii (S. I. Smith, 1882)
 Neolithodes asperrimus Barnard, 1947
 Neolithodes brodiei Dawson & Yaldwyn, 1970
 Neolithodes bronwynae Ahyong, 2010
 Neolithodes capensis Stebbing, 1905
 Neolithodes diomedeae (J. E. Benedict, 1895)
 Neolithodes duhameli Macpherson, 2004
 Neolithodes flindersi Ahyong, 2010
 Neolithodes grimaldii (A. Milne-Edwards & Bouvier, 1894)
 Neolithodes indicus Padate, Cubelio & Takeda, 2020
 Neolithodes nipponensis Sakai, 1971
 Neolithodes vinogradovi Macpherson, 1988
 Neolithodes yaldwyni Ahyong & Dawson, 2006
 Paralithodes Brandt, 1848
 Paralithodes brevipes (H. Milne Edwards & Lucas, 1841)
 Paralithodes californiensis (J. E. Benedict, 1895) – California king crab
 Paralithodes camtschaticus (Tilesius, 1815) – red king crab
 Paralithodes platypus Brandt, 1850 – blue king crab
 Paralithodes rathbuni (J. E. Benedict, 1895)
 Paralomis White, 1856
 Paralomis aculeata Henderson, 1888
 Paralomis africana Macpherson, 1982
 Paralomis alcockiana Hall & Thatje, 2009
 Paralomis anamerae Macpherson, 1988
 Paralomis arae Macpherson, 2001
 Paralomis arethusa Macpherson, 1994
 Paralomis aspera Faxon, 1893
 Paralomis birsteini Macpherson, 1988
 Paralomis bouvieri Hansen, 1908
 Paralomis ceres Macpherson, 1989
 Paralomis chilensis Andrade, 1980
 Paralomis cristata Takeda & Ohta, 1979
 Paralomis cristulata Macpherson, 1988
 Paralomis cubensis Chace, 1939
 Paralomis danida Takeda & Bussarawit, 2007
 Paralomis dawsoni Macpherson, 2001
 Paralomis debodeorum Feldmann, 1998 †
 Paralomis diomedeae (Faxon, 1893)
 Paralomis dofleini Balss, 1911
 Paralomis echidna Ahyong, 2010
 Paralomis elongata Spiridonov, Türkay, Arntz & Thatje, 2006
 Paralomis erinacea Macpherson, 1988
 Paralomis formosa Henderson, 1888
 Paralomis gowlettholmes Ahyong, 2010
 Paralomis granulosa (Hombron & Jacquinot, 1846)
 Paralomis grossmani Macpherson, 1988
 Paralomis haigae Eldredge, 1976
 Paralomis hirtella de Saint Laurent & Macpherson, 1997
 Paralomis histrix (De Haan, 1849)
 Paralomis hystrixoides Sakai, 1980
 Paralomis inca Haig, 1974
 Paralomis indica Alcock & Anderson, 1899
 Paralomis investigatoris Alcock & Anderson, 1899
 Paralomis jamsteci Takeda & Hashimoto, 1990
 Paralomis japonicus Balss, 1911
 Paralomis kyushupalauensis Takeda, 1985
 Paralomis longidactylus Birstein & Vinogradov, 1972
 Paralomis longipes Faxon, 1893
 Paralomis makarovi Hall & Thatje, 2009
 Paralomis manningi Williams, Smith & Baco, 2000
 Paralomis medipacifica Takeda, 1974
 Paralomis mendagnai Macpherson, 2003
 Paralomis microps Filhol, 1884
 Paralomis multispina (Benedict, 1895)
 Paralomis nivosa Hall & Thatje, 2009
 Paralomis ochthodes Macpherson, 1988
 Paralomis odawarai (Sakai, 1980)
 Paralomis otsuae Wilson, 1990
 Paralomis pacifica Sakai, 1978
 Paralomis papillata (Benedict, 1895)
 Paralomis pectinata Macpherson, 1988
 Paralomis phrixa Macpherson, 1992
 Paralomis poorei Ahyong, 2010
 Paralomis roeleveldae Kensley, 1981
 Paralomis seagranti Eldredge, 1976
 Paralomis serrata Macpherson, 1988
 Paralomis spectabilis Hansen, 1908
 Paralomis spinosissima Birstein & Vinogradov, 1972
 Paralomis staplesi Ahyong, 2010
 Paralomis stella Macpherson, 1988
 Paralomis stevensi Ahyong & Dawson, 2006
 Paralomis taylorae Ahyong, 2010
 Paralomis truncatispinosa Takeda & Miyake, 1980
 Paralomis tuberipes Macpherson, 1988
 Paralomis verrilli (Benedict, 1895)
 Paralomis webberi Ahyong, 2010
 Paralomis zealandica Dawson & Yaldwyn, 1971
 Phyllolithodes Brandt, 1848
 Phyllolithodes papillosus Brandt, 1848 – flatspine triangle crab, heart crab
 Rhinolithodes Brandt, 1848
 Rhinolithodes wosnessenskii Brandt, 1848 – rhinoceros crab
 Sculptolithodes Makarov, 1934
 Sculptolithodes derjugini Makarov, 1934

Glyptolithodes

Glyptolithodes is found chiefly in the Southern Hemisphere, but extending as far north as California, although all its closest relatives live in the Northern Hemisphere. Its single species, G. cristatipes, was originally placed in the genus Rhinolithodes.

Paralithodes
Red (P. camtschaticus) and blue (P. platypus) king crabs are some of the most important fisheries in Alaska. However, populations have fluctuated in the past 25 years, and some areas are currently closed due to overfishing. The two species are similar in size, shape and life history. Habitat is the main factor separating the range of blue and red king crabs in the Bering Sea. Red king crabs prefer shallow, muddy or sandy habitats in Bristol Bay and Norton Sound, while blue king crabs prefer the deeper areas made up of cobble, gravel and rock that occur around the Pribilof, St. Matthew, St. Lawrence, and Diomede Islands.

Red king crabs have an 11-month brood cycle in their first reproductive year and a 12-month cycle thereafter. Both red and blue king crabs have planktotrophic larvae that undergo 4 zoeal stages in the water column and a non-feeding intermediate glaucothoe stage which seeks appropriate habitat on the sea floor.

Paralithodes camtschaticus

The red king crab, Paralithodes camtschaticus, is a very large species, sometimes reaching a carapace width of 11 in (28 cm) and a leg span of 6 ft (1.8 m). Its natural range is the Bering Sea around the Kamchatka Peninsula area, between the Aleutian Islands and St. Lawrence Island. It can also be found in the Barents Sea and the European Arctic, where it was intentionally introduced and has now become a pest. By 2022 they had spread to the North Sea, becoming both a lucrative new stock to British fisheries, and an invasive species.

Paralithodes platypus

The blue king crab, Paralithodes platypus, lives near St. Matthew Island, the Pribilof Islands, and the Diomede Islands, Alaska, and there are populations along the coasts of Japan and Russia. Blue king crabs from the Pribilof Islands are the largest of all the king crabs, sometimes exceeding 18 lb (8 kg) in weight.

Symbiosis
Juveniles of species of king crabs, including Neolithodes diomedeae, use a species (Scotoplanes Sp. A) of sea cucumber (often known as “sea pigs”) as hosts and can be found on top of and under Scotoplanes. The Scotoplanes reduce the risk of predation for the N. diomedeae, while the Scotoplanes are not harmed from being hosts, which supports the consensus that the two organisms have a commensal relationship.

Parasites
Some species of king crab, including lithodes, neolithodes, paralithodes, and likely lopholithodes, act as hosts to some parasitic species of careproctus fish. The careproctus lays eggs in the gill chamber of the king crab which serves as a well-protected and aerated area for the eggs to reside until they hatch. On occasion king crabs have been found to be host to the eggs of multiple species of careproctus simultaneously.

See also

 Alaskan king crab fishing
 Deadliest Catch

References

External links
 
 

 
Anomura
Edible crustaceans
Alaskan cuisine